Oak Creek may refer to:

Streams
Oak Creek (Arizona), and its gorge Oak Creek Canyon
Oak Creek (Huerfano County, Colorado), a tributary of the Huerfano River
Oak Creek (Marys River), in Oregon
Oak Creek (New York), in New York
Oak Creek (Eagle Creek tributary), a stream in Holt County, Nebraska
Oak Creek (Niobrara River tributary), a stream in Rock County, Nebraska
Oak Creek (White River), a stream in South Dakota
Oak Creek (Owens River), a stream in Inyo County, California

Towns
Oak Creek, Colorado
Oak Creek, Wisconsin, a city
Oak Creek Township, Bottineau County, North Dakota
Oak Creek Township, Butler County, Nebraska
Oak Creek Township, Saunders County, Nebraska
Village of Oak Creek, Arizona

Other
Oak Creek Nature Reserve, in New South Wales, Australia

See also